Kai Frederick Wehmeier (born 1968) is a German-American philosopher and logician.

Wehmeier is currently a professor in the Department of Logic and Philosophy of Science and the Department of Philosophy at the University of California, Irvine. He is also the director of UC Irvine's Center for the Advancement of Logic, its Philosophy, History, and Applications (C-ALPHA).

Selected publications
 "Consistent Fragments of Grundgesetze and the Existence of Non-Logical Objects," Synthese 121, 1999, pp. 309–328.
 "In the Mood," Journal of Philosophical Logic 33, 2004, pp. 607–630.
 "How to live without identity—and why," Australasian Journal of Philosophy 90, 2012, pp. 761–777. 
 "Subjunctivity and Conditionals," The Journal of Philosophy 110, 2013, pp. 117–142.

External links
Wehmeier's personal website 
Center for the Advancement of Logic, its Philosophy, History, and Applications (C-ALPHA)

Notes and references 

1968 births
Living people
20th-century American philosophers
21st-century American philosophers
American logicians
University of California, Irvine faculty